Van Schuppen is a Dutch and Flemish surname. Notable people with the surname include:

 Anne van Schuppen (born 1960), former long-distance runner from the Netherlands
 Jacob van Schuppen (1670–1751), Baroque painter
 Jan H. van Schuppen (born 1947), Dutch mathematician and an academic researcher
 Pieter van Schuppen (1627 – Paris, 7 March 1702) a Flemish painter and engraver and father of Jacob van Schuppen

Surnames of Dutch origin